Sammi Kane Kraft (April 2, 1992 – October 9, 2012) was an American baseball player, musician and actress.

Born in Livingston, New Jersey, she starred in the 2005 remake of Bad News Bears as Amanda Wurlitzer. She was featured in an ESPN.com Page 2-story about her athletic skills, and competed in the Junior Olympics. She began a garage folk project in San Francisco under the name of Scary Girls and continued to record music.

Death
On October 9, 2012, at 1:30 am, Kraft was riding in the passenger seat of a car when it rear-ended a semi trailer and was then struck by another vehicle, according to the California Highway Patrol. Subsequently, she was pronounced dead at the Cedars Sinai Medical Center.

Alana Haim of the band HAIM has the initials "SKK" taped to her guitar in memory of Kraft. The third verse of HAIM's song, Hallelujah, is about the effect of Kraft's death on Alana, who was best friends with her at the time of her death.

Kraft's heart was donated by her parents to Yvonne Payne, wife of Fox Business Network's Charles Payne.

References

External links

Scary Girls on SoundCloud
Sammi Kane Kraft at Find a Grave

1992 births
2012 deaths
21st-century American actresses
Actresses from New Jersey
American child actresses
American film actresses
Burials at Hillside Memorial Park Cemetery
Jewish American actresses
People from Livingston, New Jersey
Road incident deaths in California
Organ transplant donors
San Francisco State University alumni
21st-century American Jews